Michael Eugene Ciccolella (born October 19, 1943) is a former American football linebacker who played with the National Football League's (NFL) New York Giants from 1966 to 1968.

Born in Follansbee, West Virginia, Ciccolella attended St. Anthony's High School before being recruited to the University of Dayton in 1960. He played for the school's football team from 1962 to 1964, serving as a captain in his final season. In the 1965 NFL Draft, the Giants selected Ciccolella in the 18th round with the 239th overall pick. During the 1966 season, Ciccolella's first year with the Giants, they made him their starting middle linebacker. After playing in all 14 games that year, Ciccolella participated in only 7 the following season, having suffered an ankle injury in a preseason game. He lost his role as a starter because of the injury; for 1968, he was behind Henry Davis on the Giants' depth chart. In 14 games in 1968, Ciccolella had one interception in a game against the New Orleans Saints, which he returned for seven yards. The Giants waived Ciccolella before the 1969 season; in his three-year career he played in 35 games.

References

External links
NFL.com profile

1943 births
American football middle linebackers
Dayton Flyers football players
Living people
New York Giants players
People from Follansbee, West Virginia
Players of American football from West Virginia